Sherman County is a county in the U.S. state of Nebraska. As of the 2010 United States Census, the population was 3,152. Its county seat is Loup City. The county was created in 1870, and was organized in 1872. It was named for American Civil War General William Tecumseh Sherman.

In the Nebraska license plate system, Sherman County is represented by the prefix 56 (it had the fifty-sixth-largest number of vehicles registered in the county when the license plate system was established in 1922).

Geography
The terrain of Sherman County consists of rolling hills, sloping to the southeast. The area is partially dedicated to agriculture, with limited use of center pivot irrigation. The Middle Loup River flows south-southeastward through the eastern central part of the county. The western portions are drained by Clear Creek and Muddy Creek, which merge in the SW part of the county and exit the south boundary line, to discharge into Middle Loup River at a point southeast of the county's SE corner.

Major highways

  Nebraska Highway 2
  Nebraska Highway 10
  Nebraska Highway 58
  Nebraska Highway 68
  Nebraska Highway 92

Adjacent counties

 Howard County – east
 Buffalo County – south
 Custer County – west
 Valley County – north
 Greeley County – northeast

Protected areas
 Sherman Reservoir State Recreation Area

Demographics

As of the 2000 United States Census, there were 3,152 people, 1,392 households, and 903 families in the county. The population density was 5.6 people per square mile (2/km2). There were 1,392 occupied housing units and 1,941 total housing units. The racial makeup of the county was 99% White, 0.1% Black or African American, 0.1% Native American, 0.3% Asian, 0.1% from other races, and 0.4% from two or more races. 1% of the population were Hispanic or Latino of any race.

There were 1,392 households, out of which 27.6% had children under the age of 18 living with them, 59.2% were married couples living together, 5.7% had a female householder with no husband present, and 32.9% were non-families. 30.4% of all households were made up of individuals, and 16.7% had someone living alone who was 65 years of age or older.  The average household size was 2.22 and the average family size was 2.78.

The county population contained 22.4% under the age of 18, 54.2% from 18 to 64, and 23.4% 65 years of age or older. The median age was 47.8 years. 50.9% of the population were female and 49.1% were male.

The median income for a household in the county was $39,041, and the median income for a family was $34,821. Males had a median income of $23,065 versus $17,269 for females. The per capita income for the county was $26,416. About 14.1% of the population were below the poverty line.

Sherman County is one of the main Polish-American communities in the state and in the country. As of the census of 2000, Americans of Polish ancestry comprised 29.6% of Sherman County's population.

Communities

Cities
 Loup City (county seat)

Villages

 Ashton
 Hazard
 Litchfield
 Rockville

Politics
Sherman County voters tend to vote Republican. In only three national elections since 1948 has the county selected the Democratic Party candidate (as of 2020).

See also
 National Register of Historic Places listings in Sherman County, Nebraska

References

 
Polish-American culture in Nebraska
1873 establishments in Nebraska
Populated places established in 1873